The White Horse Mountains are a mountain range in Harney County, Oregon.

References 

Mountain ranges of Oregon
Mountain ranges of Harney County, Oregon